Rafael Santos Bergamasco or simply Rafael Akai (born January 17, 1986 in Presidente Prudente), is a Brazilian striker currently playing for Olímpia Futebol Clube.

Career
Rafael Akai signed for Sport Club Corinthians Paulista, and made his senior debut in the Campeonato Paulista on 19 March 2006, after manager Ademar Braga rested his first team for an upcoming Copa Libertadores match. He would make a total of four appearances for Corinthians, scoring once, in the 2006 Paulista before being sent on loan to Paraguayan side Club 2 de Mayo and later signing for São José Esporte Clube.

Rafael Akai made 4 goals in the Paranaense Championship 2008 playing for Londrina and moved to FC Rostov in the Russian First Division on loan.

Contract
9 December 2005 to 31 January 2008

References

External links
 CBF
 Brasileirão de verdade começa agor
 Com golaço de Élton, Corinthians empata com Paulista
 Favoritos ao acesso predominam na Seleção da Rodada da A-2
 Son heves Tevez
 Profile

1986 births
Living people
People from Presidente Prudente, São Paulo
Brazilian footballers
Brazilian expatriate footballers
Mirassol Futebol Clube players
Cruzeiro Esporte Clube players
Associação Desportiva São Caetano players
Paraná Clube players
Sport Club Corinthians Paulista players
São José Esporte Clube players
FC Rostov players
Ceará Sporting Club players
Expatriate footballers in Russia
Association football forwards
Footballers from São Paulo (state)